Carl Brazell (July 20, 1917 – May 3, 1978) was an American football running back. He played for the Cleveland Rams in 1938.

References

1917 births
1978 deaths
American football running backs
Baylor Bears football players
Cleveland Rams players
Players of American football from Arkansas
People from Clarksville, Arkansas